Adoxophyes vindicata is a species of moth of the family Tortricidae. It is found on the Solomon Islands.

The forewings are whitish-ochreous, the basal patch indicated by median and subdorsal ferruginous streaks and the central fascia represented by dark fuscous triangular costal and dorsal spots connected by a ferruginous stria. The hindwings are ochreous-whitish.

References

Moths described in 1910
Adoxophyes
Moths of Oceania